Margaret Ann Whitton (November 30, 1949 – December 4, 2016) was an American stage, film, and television actress.

Life and career
Whitton was born on Fort Meade, Maryland, a US Army base in the suburbs of Baltimore. She spent many of her formative years in Japan; her father was an Army colonel, and her mother was a nurse. The family eventually relocated to Haddonfield, New Jersey, and then to Fort Lauderdale, Florida, where Whitton started acting at Northeast High School. She made her Off-Broadway debut in 1973 with Baby Goya, and her Broadway debut in 1982's Steaming.

Whitton did her primary film work between 1986 and 1993. Her most visible roles were that of socialite Vera Prescott in The Secret of My Success (1987), and spiteful baseball team owner Rachel Phelps in Major League (1989), and its sequel Major League II (1994). Whitton also appeared in The Best of Times (1986) and The Man Without a Face (1993). Her other film roles included parts in National Lampoon Goes to the Movies (1982), Love Child (1982) and 9½ Weeks (1986).

Whitton worked as a television actress, with appearances in the soap operas One Life to Live and The Doctors. Her first prime time role was in the 1985 dramedy Hometown. In 1989, Whitton played a divorcee in the short-lived comedy series A Fine Romance. She later starred in the 1991 sitcom Good & Evil, which was cancelled after six episodes.

Whitton returned to the stage, appearing on Broadway in And the Apple Doesn't Fall... (1995), as Mac in Jeffrey Hatcher's The Three Viewings (1995), and in the original musical Marlene (1999).

Distribution rights to her film A Bird of the Air were acquired by Freestyle Digital Media. It was based upon the novel The Loop by Joe Coomer and was adapted for film by Roger Towne. At the time of her death, Whitton served as president of Tashtego Films, an independent-film production company, co-founded with producer Steven Tabakin.

Personal life
Whitton was married to Bear, Stearns & Co. executive Warren Spector from 1993 until her death in 2016.

Death
Whitton died on December 4, 2016, four days after her 67th birthday, at her home in Florida after a brief battle with cancer.

Filmography

Film

Television

References

External links
 
 
 
 
 A Bird of the Air official website
 

1949 births
2016 deaths
People from Fort Meade, Maryland
Actresses from Maryland
Actresses from Philadelphia
American film actresses
American stage actresses
American television actresses
Deaths from cancer in Florida
21st-century American women